Gun Jönsson (13 December 1929 – 27 October 2021) was a Swedish actress. She appeared in more than 20 films and television shows between 1948 and 2006.

Selected filmography
 Harry Munter (1969)
 A Guy and a Gal (1975)

References

External links

1929 births
2021 deaths
20th-century Swedish actresses
21st-century Swedish actresses
Swedish television actresses
People from Vetlanda Municipality